Yevgeni Vasilyevich Kornyukhin (born 7 March 1967) is a Russian professional football coach and a former player. He is a goalkeepers' coach with FC Khimki.

Club career
He made his professional debut in the Soviet Second League in 1988 for FC Pakhtakor Andijan.

Honours
 Russian Premier League bronze: 2000.
 Russian Cup finalist: 2005 (played in the early stages of the 2004/05 tournament for FC Khimki).
 Russian Second Division Zone Center best goalkeeper: 2005.

European club competitions
 UEFA Intertoto Cup 1998 with FC Shinnik Yaroslavl: 3 games.
 UEFA Cup 2000–01 with FC Torpedo Moscow: 1 game.

References

1967 births
Footballers from Moscow
Living people
Soviet footballers
Russian footballers
Association football goalkeepers
Russian Premier League players
Pakhtakor Tashkent FK players
FC Rostov players
FC Zenit Saint Petersburg players
FC Tekstilshchik Kamyshin players
FC Shinnik Yaroslavl players
FC Torpedo Moscow players
FC Torpedo-2 players
FC Saturn Ramenskoye players
FC Khimki players
FC Salyut Belgorod players
FC Sokol Saratov players